Queenstown East is a residential suburb of Queenstown in the South Island of New Zealand.  runs through it.

Queenstown Gardens is a boatnical garden in the southwest part of the suburb.

Demographics

Queenstown East had a population of 3,333 at the 2018 New Zealand census, an increase of 402 people (13.7%) since the 2013 census, and an increase of 834 people (33.4%) since the 2006 census. There were 1,044 households. There were 1,761 males and 1,572 females, giving a sex ratio of 1.12 males per female, with 231 people (6.9%) aged under 15 years, 1,299 (39.0%) aged 15 to 29, 1,560 (46.8%) aged 30 to 64, and 237 (7.1%) aged 65 or older.

Ethnicities were 71.9% European/Pākehā, 4.1% Māori, 0.8% Pacific peoples, 19.0% Asian, and 9.5% other ethnicities (totals add to more than 100% since people could identify with multiple ethnicities).

The proportion of people born overseas was 63.2%, compared with 27.1% nationally.

Although some people objected to giving their religion, 59.3% had no religion, 26.9% were Christian, 3.0% were Hindu, 0.6% were Muslim, 2.8% were Buddhist and 3.4% had other religions.

Of those at least 15 years old, 867 (27.9%) people had a bachelor or higher degree, and 183 (5.9%) people had no formal qualifications. 447 people (14.4%) earned over $70,000 compared to 17.2% nationally. The employment status of those at least 15 was that 2,424 (78.1%) people were employed full-time, 288 (9.3%) were part-time, and 36 (1.2%) were unemployed.

References 

Suburbs of Queenstown, New Zealand
Populated places in Otago
Populated places on Lake Wakatipu